Filip Vecheta (born 15 February 2003) is a Czech footballer who currently plays as a forward for Slovácko.

Career statistics

Club

Notes

References

2003 births
Living people
Czech footballers
Czech Republic youth international footballers
Association football forwards
Czech First League players
1. SC Znojmo players
1. FC Slovácko players